Copenhagen is a green city well endowed with open spaces. It has an extensive and well-distributed system of parks that act as venues for a wide array of events and urban life. As a supplement to the regular parks, there are a number of congenial public gardens and some cemeteries doubling as parks. It is official municipal policy in Copenhagen that all citizens by 2015 must be able to reach a park or beach on foot in less than 15 minutes.

Parks

King's Garden  the garden of Rosenborg Castle, is the oldest and most visited park in Copenhagen. Its landscaping was commenced by Christian IV in 1606. Every year it sees more than 2.5 million visitors, and in the summer months it is packed with sunbathers, picknickers and ballplayers. It also serves as a sculpture garden with a permanent display of sculptures as well as temporary exhibits during summer. Just north of King's Garden a series of parks make up a green strand running right through the centre of the city. These are constructed on the old ramparts of the city and include Østre Anlæg  and Ørsted Park  as well as the Botanical Garden  which is particularly noted for a large complex of 19th-century greenhouses donated by Carlsberg founder J. C. Jacobsen.

Fælledparken  in the northern part of the city is, at 58 hectares, the largest park in Copenhagen. It is popular for sports and hosts an array of annual events, including a free opera concert at the opening of the opera season, other open-air concerts, carnival, Labour Day celebrations and the Copenhagen Historic Grand Prix, which is a race for antique cars. Another popular park is the Frederiksberg Gardens  which is a 32-hectare romantic landscape park. It houses a large colony of very tame grey herons along with other waterfowl. The park also offers views of the elephants and the elephant house, designed by the world-famous British architect Norman Foster, at the adjacent Copenhagen Zoo.

Some of Copenhagen's newer parks draw from their position by the water. Havneparken  established in 1995, covers 2.8 hectares of dockland in the Islands Brygge neighbourhood and has a bandstand roofed by an upside-down old wooden ship, as well as the first of Copenhagen's harbour baths. Amager Beach Park  was founded in 1934, but in 2005 a 2.4-kilometre-long artificial island was added, separated from the original beach by a lagoon crossed by three bridges.

It is official municipal policy in Copenhagen that all citizens by 2015 must be able to reach a park or beach on foot in less than 15 minutes. In line with this policy, several new parks are under development in areas poor in green spaces. One of those recently completed is Superkilen, an innovative park for the ethnic inhabitants of the Nørrebro district of Copenhagen.

Public gardens

Besides the regular parks, a number of gardens open to the general public serve as important green spaces in central Copenhagen. These include:
 The Library Garden  the garden of the Royal Library on Slotsholmen, located between the library and Christiansborg Palace
 The Glyptoteque Garden  the small garden behind the Ny Carlsberg Glyptotek
 Grønnegården  the inner courtyard of the Museum of Art & Design
 The Carlsberg Academy Garden in the Carlsberg District  one of two historic gardens at the former brewery site. Now open to the public during daytime.

Cemeteries

Characteristic of Copenhagen is that a number of cemeteries double as parks, though only for the more quiet activities such as sunbathing, reading and meditation. Assistens Cemetery  the burial place of Hans Christian Andersen among others, is an important green space for the district of Inner Nørrebro and a Copenhagen institution. The lesser-known Vestre Cemetery  is, at 54 hectares, the largest cemetery in Denmark and offers a maze of dense groves, open lawns, winding paths, hedges, overgrown tombs, monuments, tree-lined avenues, lakes and other garden features.

Greenways
Copenhagen Municipality is developing a system of interconnected green bicycle routes, Greenways, with the aim to facilitate fast, safe and pleasant bicycle transport from one end of the city to the other. The network will cover more than 100 kilometres and consist of 22 routes when finished.

Semi-natural areas

Some open spaces on the outskirts of Copenhagen have a more informal and semi-natural character, having originally been countryside areas protected against surrounding urbanisation. They include:

 Amager Common  is a 223 hectare protected area on Amager.
 Kalvebod Common  a 2,000-hectare protected area right next to the new business district of Ørestad. Its natural, slightly maintained parkland features a range of ecosystems, from young forests to tidal marshes; some areas are prevented from developing into forests by grazing livestock and game.
 Utterslev Mose  a 221-hectare area in the northwestern part of Copenhagen. Three lakes with extensive reed beds cover a total of 91 hectares and are surrounded by parkland.
 Deer Garden Forest Park  a 1,100-hectare nature area north of Copenhagen. The area is noted for its mixture of huge, ancient oak trees and large populations of red and fallow deer.
 Vestskoven  a 130-hectare forested area located west of Copenhagen, mainly in Albertslund Municipality
 Hareskoven  a 485-hectare forested area to the northwest of Copenhagen, situated in Furesø and Gladsaxe municipalities

References

External links